Sabre Global Distribution System, owned by Sabre Corporation, is a travel reservation system used by travel agents and companies to search, price, book, and ticket travel services provided by airlines, hotels, car rental companies, rail providers and tour 
operators. Originally developed by American Airlines under CEO C.R. Smith with the assistance of IBM in 1960, the booking service became available for use by external travel agents in 1976 and became independent of the airline in March 2000.

Overview
The system's parent company is organized into three business units:
Sabre Travel Network: global distribution system
Sabre Airline Solutions: airline technology
Sabre Hospitality Solutions: hotel technology solutions

Sabre is headquartered in Southlake, Texas, and has employees in various locations around the world.

History
The name of the travel reservation system is an abbreviation for "Semi-automated Business Research Environment", and was originally styled in all-capital letters as SABRE. It was developed to automate the way American Airlines booked reservations.

In the 1950s, American Airlines was facing a serious challenge in its ability to quickly handle airline reservations in an era that witnessed high growth in passenger volumes in the airline industry. Before the introduction of SABRE, the airline's system for booking flights was entirely manual, having developed from the techniques originally developed at its Little Rock, Arkansas, reservations center in the 1920s.  In this manual system, a team of eight operators would sort through a rotating file with cards for every flight. When a seat was booked, the operators would place a mark on the side of the card, and knew visually whether it was full. This part of the process was not all that slow, at least when there were not that many planes, but the entire end-to-end task of looking for a flight, reserving a seat, and then writing up the ticket could take up to three hours in some cases, and 90 minutes on average. The system also had limited room to scale. It was limited to about eight operators because that was the maximum that could fit around the file. To handle more queries the only solution was to add more layers of hierarchy to filter down requests into batches.

American Airlines had already attacked the problem to some degree, and was in the process of introducing their new Magnetronic Reservisor, an electromechanical computer, in 1952 to replace the card files. This computer consisted of a single magnetic drum, each memory location holding the number of seats left on a particular flight. Using this system, a large number of operators could access information simultaneously, so the ticket agents could be told via phone if a seat was available. On the downside, a staff member was needed at each end of the phone line, and handling the ticket took considerable effort and filing. Something much more highly automated was needed if American Airlines was going to enter the jet age, booking many times more seats.

During the testing phase of the Reservisor a high-ranking IBM salesman, Blair Smith, was flying on an American Airlines flight from Los Angeles back to IBM in New York City in 1953.  He found himself sitting next to American Airlines president C. R. Smith.  Noting that they shared a family name, they began talking.

Just prior to this chance meeting, IBM had been working with the United States Air Force on their Semi Automatic Ground Environment (SAGE) project. SAGE used a series of large computers to coordinate the message flow from radar sites to interceptors, dramatically reducing the time needed to direct an attack on an incoming bomber. The system used teleprinter machines located around the world to feed information into the system, which then sent orders back to teleprinters located at the fighter bases. It was one of the first online systems.

Smith and Watson observed that the SAGE system's basic architecture was suitable for use in American Airlines' booking services. Teleprinters would be placed at American Airlines' ticketing offices to send in requests and receive responses directly, without the need for anyone on the other end of the phone. The number of available seats on the aircraft could be tracked automatically, and if a seat was available the ticket agent could be notified. Booking simply took one more command, updating the availability and, if desired, could be followed by printing a ticket.

Thirty days later IBM sent a research proposal to American Airlines, suggesting that they join forces to study the problem. A team was set up consisting of IBM engineers led by John Siegfried and a large number of American Airlines' staff led by Malcolm Perry, taken from booking, reservations, and ticket sales, calling the effort the Semi-Automated Business Research Environment, or SABRE.

A formal development arrangement was signed in 1957. The first experimental system went online in 1960, based on two IBM 7090 mainframes in a new data center located in Briarcliff Manor, New York. The system was a success. Up to this point, it had cost $40 million to develop and install (about $350 million in 2000 dollars). The SABRE system by IBM in the 1960s was specified to process a very large number of transactions, such as handling 83,000 daily phone calls. The system took over all booking functions in 1964, when the name had changed to SABRE.

In 1972, SABRE was migrated to IBM System/360 systems in a new underground location in Tulsa, Oklahoma. Max Hopper joined American Airlines in 1972 as director of SABRE, and pioneered its use. Originally used only by American Airlines, the system was expanded to access by travel agents in 1976.

With SABRE up and running, IBM offered its expertise to other airlines, and soon developed Deltamatic for Delta Air Lines on the IBM 7074, and PANAMAC for Pan American World Airways using an IBM 7080. In 1968, they generalized their work into the PARS (Programmed Airline Reservation System), which ran on any member of the IBM System/360 family and thus could support any sized airline. The operating system component of PARS evolved into ACP (Airlines Control Program), and later to TPF (Transaction Processing Facility). Application programs were originally written in assembly language, later in SabreTalk, a proprietary dialect of PL/I, and now in C and C++.

By the 1980s, SABRE offered airline reservations through the CompuServe Information Service, and the Prodigy Internet Service GEnie under the Eaasy SABRE brand. This service was extended to America Online (AOL) in the 1990s.

American and Sabre separated on March 15, 2000. Sabre had been a publicly traded corporation, Sabre Holdings, stock symbol TSG on the New York Stock Exchange until taken private in March 2007. The corporation introduced the new logo and changed from the all-caps acronym "SABRE" to the mixed-case "Sabre Holdings", when the new corporation was formed. The Travelocity website, introduced in 1996, was owned by Sabre Holdings. Travelocity was acquired by Expedia in January 2015. Sabre Holdings' three remaining business units, Sabre Travel Network, Sabre Airline Solutions and Sabre Hospitality, today serves as a global travel technology company.

Other airline systems
In 1982, Advertising Age reported that "United Airlines operates a similar system, Apollo, while Eastern operates Mars and Delta operates Datas." Braniff International's Cowboy system was considered by Electronic Data Systems for building an airline-neutral system.

Controversy
A 1982 study by American Airlines found that travel agents selected the flight appearing on the first line more than half the time.  Ninety-two percent of the time, the selected flight was on the first screen.  This provided a huge incentive for American to manipulate its ranking formula, or even corrupt the search algorithm outright, to favor American flights over its competitors in the results of flight search results, and the airline did not resist the temptation.

At first this was limited to juggling the relative importance of factors such as the length of the flight, how close the actual departure time was to the desired time, and whether the flight had a connection, but with each success American became bolder.  In late 1981, New York Air added a flight from La Guardia to Detroit, challenging American in an important market.  Before long, the new flights suddenly started appearing at the bottom of the screen.  Its reservations dried up, and it was forced to cut back from eight Detroit flights a day to none.

On one occasion, Sabre deliberately withheld Continental's discount fares on 49 routes where American competed.  A Sabre staffer had been directed to work on a program that would automatically suppress any discount fares loaded into the system.

Congress investigated these practices, and in 1983 Bob Crandall, president of American, vocally defended the airline's preferential treatment of its own offerings in the system. "The preferential display of our flights, and the corresponding increase in our market share, is the competitive raison d'être for having created the system in the first place," he told them. The U.S. government disagreed, and in 1984 it outlawed the biasing practices for the search results.

Even after biases were eliminated, travel agents using the system leased and serviced by American were significantly more likely to choose American over other airlines. The same was true of United and its Apollo system. The airlines referred to this phenomenon as the "halo" effect.

The fairness rules were eliminated or allowed to expire in 2010. By then, none of the major distribution systems was majority owned by the airlines.

In 1987 Sabre's success of selling to European travel agents was inhibited by the refusal of big European carriers led by British Airways to grant the system ticketing authority for their flights even though Sabre had obtained IATA Billing and Settlement Plan (BSP) clearance for the UK in 1986. American brought High Court action which alleged that after the arrival of Sabre on its doorstep British Airways immediately offered financial incentives to travel agents who continued to use Travicom and would tie any override commissions to it. Travicom was created by Videcom, British Airways and British Caledonian and launched in 1976 as the world's first multi-access reservations system based on Videcom technology which eventually became part of Galileo UK. It connected 49 subscribing international airlines (including British Airways, British Caledonian, TWA, Pan American World Airways, Qantas, Singapore Airlines, Air France, Lufthansa, SAS, Air Canada, KLM, Alitalia, Cathay Pacific and JAL) to thousands of travel agents in the UK. It allowed agents and airlines to communicate via a common distribution language and network, handling 97% of UK airline business trade bookings by 1987.

British Airways eventually bought out the stakes in Travicom held by Videcom and British Caledonian, to become the sole owner. Although Sabre's vice-president in London, David Schwarte, made representations to the U.S. Department of Transportation and the British Monopolies Commission, British Airways defended the use of Travicom as a truly non-discriminatory system in flight selection because an agent had access to some 50 carriers worldwide, including Sabre, for flight information.

See also
 Travelocity
 List of global distribution systems
 Passenger name record
 Code sharing
 Electronic Recording Machine, Accounting (ERMA) – another pioneering early system. ERMA, SAGE and SABRE helped legitimize computers in business.
 Real-time operating system – SABRE was one of the first such systems
 Perry O. Crawford Jr.
 Travel technology
 Galileo CRS
 Navitaire
 Travelport

References

 Robert V. Head, "Getting Sabre off the Ground", IEEE Annals of the History of Computing, vol. 24, no. 4, pp. 32–39, Oct.-Dec. 2002,

Further reading
 Robert V. Head, Real-Time Business Systems, Holt, Rinehart and Winston, New York, 1964. "This book embodies many of the lessons learned about new technology application management while working on the ERMA and Sabre systems".
 D.G. Copeland, R.O. Mason, and J.L. McKenney, "Sabre: The Development of Information-Based Competence and Execution of Information-Based Competition," IEEE Annals of the History of Computing, vol. 17, no. 3, Fall 1995, pp. 30–57.
 R.D. Norby, "The American Airlines Sabre System," in James D. Gallagher, Management Information Systems and the Computer, Am. Management Assoc. Research Study, 1961, pp. 150–176.
 IBM General Information Manual, 9090 Airlines Reservation System, 1961.

External links
Oral history interview with R. Blair Smith.  Charles Babbage Institute, University of Minnesota, Minneapolis.  Smith discusses how a chance meeting with C. R. Smith, president of American Airlines, eventually led to the development of the SABRE system.
The Mad Men's Best Friend Was SABRE on Wired.com
Sabre at IBM100
Sabre Holdings
Virtually There public site for viewing reservations made through Sabre.
Some History features a history of ACP/TPF the Operating System used on SABRE

Travel technology
Assembly language software
American Airlines
Computer reservation systems